Robert John Beckley   is a senior British police officer, since November 2016 seconded as an Assistant Commissioner  from the Metropolitan Police to the Home Office to head the Command Team of Operation Resolve, the investigation into the Hillsborough disaster. He was awarded the Queen's Police Medal in 2007.

Early life
Beckley graduated in Law from the University of Durham (University College). He spent four years working in development and education in Africa before joining the police.

Career
His first police service was with the Metropolitan Police in Brixton, Southall and New Scotland Yard (1986–1997), with whom he rose to the rank of Chief Inspector, before being promoted to Chief Superintendent during a subsequent spell in Thames Valley Police (1997–2002). He was then promoted to Assistant Chief Constable just before moving to head Territorial Operations (and later Crime and Operations) in Hertfordshire Police (2002–2007) then to become Deputy Chief Constable of Avon and Somerset Police (2007–2016).

In parallel with these posts he also held the national portfolio for citizens in policing and later for counter-terrorism and matters of race and faith. This was followed by time as Chief Operating Officer of the new College of Policing from July 2013 to 2016, after which he was appointed an Assistant Commissioner in the Metropolitan Police simultaneously with his appointment to his role with Operation Resolve. In April 2018, in his role with the Home Office, he responded to the investigation into Operation Midland by recommending a move away from police automatically believing victims to one in which victims were reassured they were being listened to.

Honours

References

Living people
Assistant Commissioners of Police of the Metropolis
Hertfordshire Constabulary officers
Date of birth missing (living people)
English recipients of the Queen's Police Medal
British police chief officers
Year of birth missing (living people)
Alumni of University College, Durham